Daya Shankar was an officer of the Indian Revenue Service who retired as chief of the Indian Customs in Mumbai. He was known for his crackdown on gold smuggling networks in Daman, Goa and Mumbai. Shankar's most famous crackdown was on Dawood Ibrahim.

 he was from Patna Bihar

References

Further reading

Police officers from Mumbai
Living people
Indian Revenue Service officers
Year of birth missing (living people)